Fantino is a city in the Dominican Republic. The name may also be used for:

Geography 
 Monte Fantino is a mountain in the Ligurian Alps.

Music 
 An instrumental tune by Sébastien Tellier, originally released on his debut album L'incroyable Vérité, that featured on the soundtrack of the 2003 film Lost in Translation

People 
 Given name
 Saint Fantinus (local Italian Santo Fantino), two incumbents

 Last name
 Alejandro Fantino, Argentine TV host
 Edmund Fantino, American psychologist
 Julian Fantino, commissioner of the Ontario provincial Police